The Evergreen State may refer to:

The Evergreen State College
Nickname for Washington (state)